Muragari Primary School is the third-oldest school in Embu, Kenya. It was founded 1932 by the National Independent Church of Africa near the current Mukuuri Township, Kagaari North Ward, Runyenjes Sub County.

It was razed by colonialists in 1952 during the Mau Mau Uprising in Embu.

Muragari was rebuilt in 1955 on 24 acres as a government school, at the site where General Kubu Kubu was cremated after being shot dead by colonial officers.

Muragari now comprises a day primary school, Muragari Secondary School and Kubu Kubu Memorial Boarding Primary School in memory of General Kubu Kubu.

Notable alumni
 Stanley Nyaga Kithung'a, founder of KASNEB and former Runyenjes MP
Joseph Njagi Mbarire, MP
 Cecily Mutitu Mbarire , MP
 Hon. Martin Wambora, Embu Governor
 Richard Nyaga, former Kenya Airways CEO
 Dr. Njiru Nthakanio, geneticist
 Mohammed Gakinya, Long serving KNUT Secretary General
 Njeru Ngari, Embu County Chairman and long-serving councillor
 Sicily Njiru, nominated MCA, Embu County
 Amos Njiru, former NICA Embu Bishop

External links

Elementary and primary schools in Kenya
Education in Eastern Province (Kenya)
Embu County
High schools and secondary schools in Kenya
Boarding schools in Kenya